The Dean of Nova Scotia is an Anglican dean in the Anglican Diocese of Nova Scotia and Prince Edward Island of the  Ecclesiastical Province of Canada, based at All Saints Cathedral in Halifax, Nova Scotia. The incumbent is also Rector of All Saints.

The incumbents have been:

Source:

References

Lists of people from Nova Scotia